The 1979–80 British Home Championship saw only the second undisputed victory for Northern Ireland in the British Home Nations international football tournament in 96 years of its existence. It was the first time since 1970 that Scotland agreed to travel to Northern Ireland, having refused to play there since 1972. 

The opening matches provided two great shocks for the long-established favourites of England and Scotland, with a narrow Northern Irish home victory over the Scots and a Welsh 4–1 thrashing of the English, putting the underdogs in pole position going into their remaining rounds. Scotland recovered slightly with a narrow victory over the Welsh, but England could only manage a draw with the Northern Irish, who were in the best position to claim undisputed first place for 66 years. In the final matches, England salvaged pride and points with a win over the Scots taking them to second place, but the Northern Irish claimed the trophy by defeating Wales in Cardiff, celebrating their centenary with a rare triumph.

Table

Results

References

External links
Full Results and Line-ups

1980
1980 in British sport
1979–80 in Northern Ireland association football
1979–80 in Welsh football
1979–80 in English football
1979–80 in Scottish football